Crossroads, crossroad, cross road or similar may refer to:

 Crossroads (junction), where four roads meet

Film and television

Films
 Crossroads (1928 film), a 1928 Japanese film by Teinosuke Kinugasa
 Cross Roads (film), a 1930 British film by Reginald Fogwell
 Crossroads (1937 film), a Chinese film starring Zhao Dan
 Crossroads (1942 film), a mystery film starring William Powell and Hedy Lamarr
 The Crossroads (1951 film), an Italian crime film by Fernando Cerchio
 The Crossroads (1952 film), an Argentine film
 The Crossroads (1960 film), a French-Spanish drama film by Alfonso Balcázar
 Crossroads (1976 film), a film by Bruce Conner
 Crossroad, a 1976 Hong Kong-Taiwanese film by Chin Han
 Crossroads (1986 film), a film starring Ralph Macchio
 The Crossroad, a 1988 documentary film by Ivars Seleckis
 Crossroads (2002 film), a film starring Britney Spears
 Crossroads: A Story of Forgiveness, a 2007 film starring Dean Cain
 Crossroad (2017 film), an Indian anthology film
 Crossroads (2017 film), a Nigerian short thriller film

Television

Series
 Crossroads (1955 TV series), a 1955–1957 American anthology series centered on the lives of members of the clergy of various religious denominations
 Crossroads (1992 TV series), a 1992–1993 American drama series following a Manhattan attorney and his son touring America by motorbike
 Crossroads (1994 TV program), a 1994–1998 American alternative music video television program
 Crossroads (British TV series), a British soap opera that aired from 1964 to 1988 and 2001–2003
 Crossroads (Kazakhstani TV series), a soap opera
 CMT Crossroads, a 2002 American television program pairing country music artists with musicians from other genres

Episodes
 "Crossroads" (Band of Brothers), the fifth episode (2001)
 "Crossroads" (Battlestar Galactica), the nineteenth and twentieth episodes (2007)
 "Crossroads" (Jericho), the ninth episode (2006)
 "Crossroads" (Stargate SG-1), the seventieth episode (2000)
 "The Crossroads", an AEW Dynamite special episode (2021)

Literature
 As God Commands (novel) or The Crossroads, a novel by Niccolò Ammaniti
 Crossroads (series), a high fantasy series of books by Kate Elliott
 The Crossroads (novel), a children's novel by Chris Grabenstein
 Cross Roads (novel), a novel by William Paul Young
 Crossroads (comics), a limited series from First Comics
 Crossroad (manga), a 2003 manga series
 Crossroads, a series of Dragonlance novels
 Crossroads (play), a 2009 play by Bahram Beyzai
 Crossroads (novel), a 2021 novel by Jonathan Franzen

Music
 Crossroads (quartet), 2009 Barbershop Harmony Society international champions
 Crossroads (Sanjay Shrestha), a Nepali pop band founded by Sanjay Shrestha
 Cross Road (videos), a 1994 set of videos by Bon Jovi
 Crossroads Guitar Festival, a blues and rock concert arranged by Eric Clapton

Albums
 Cross Road (album), a 1994 compilation album by Bon Jovi
 Crossroads (Tracy Chapman album) (1989) or its title track
 Crossroads (Eric Clapton album) (1988)
 Crossroads (Jerry González album) (1994)
 Crossroads (mind.in.a.box album) (2007)
 Crossroad (Masami Okui album) (2002)
 Crossroad (Calvin Russell album) (2000)
 Crossroads (Sylver album) (2006)
 Crossroads (1986 soundtrack)
 Crossroads 2: Live in the Seventies (1996)
 Crossroads: 2010, an album by Bizzy Bone

Songs
 "Cross Road Blues", a 1936 blues song by Robert Johnson, later recorded as "Crossroads" by many other musicians
 "Crossroads", a 1967 song by Gordon Lightfoot, from The Way I Feel
 "Crossroads", a 1971 song by Don McLean, from American Pie
 "Crossroads" (Tracy Chapman song), a 1989 single by Tracy Chapman
 "Crossroads", a 1991 single by Calvin Russell
 "Crossroads", a song by LL Cool J from his 1993 album 14 Shots to the Dome
 "Cross Road" (song), a 1993 single by Mr. Children
 "Tha Crossroads", a 1996 single by Bone Thugs-n-Harmony
 "Crossroads", a 2002 single by Blazin' Squad
 "Crossroads", a song by Avenged Sevenfold from their 2008 compilation album Live in the LBC & Diamonds in the Rough
 "Crossroad" (song), a 2010 song by Ayumi Hamasaki
 "Crossroads" (GFriend song), a song by GFriend from their 2020 extended play 回:Labyrinth
 "Cross Roads", a song by YoungBoy Never Broke Again from his 2020 album Top

Organizations
 Crossroads (Cincinnati), an interdenominational church in Cincinnati, Ohio
 Crossroads Centre, an addiction rehabilitation facility in Antigua and Barbuda
 Crossroads Foundation, a non-profit charity based in Hong Kong

Companies
 Crossroad Publishing Company, a Christian media organization
 Crossroads Christian Communications, a media company and television network in Canada

Places
 Cross Roads, West Yorkshire, England
 Cross Roads, Jamaica, a neighbourhood of Kingston
 Crossroads, Cape Town, South Africa

Australia
 Crossroads (medieval village), a medieval project in New South Wales
 Cross Road, Adelaide, a road in Adelaide
 Cross Roads, South Australia, a locality

United States
 Cross Roads, Monroe County, Arkansas
 Cross Roads, Delaware County, Indiana
 Cross Roads, Ripley County, Indiana
 Crossroads, Indiana
 Florence, Kentucky, formerly known as Crossroads
 Hustonville, Kentucky, formerly known as The Crossroads
 Crossroads, George County, Mississippi
 Cross Roads, Rankin County, Mississippi
 Cross Roads, Douglas County, Missouri
 Cross Roads, St. Francois County, Missouri
 Cross Roads, Stone County, Missouri
 Crossroads, Kansas City, a neighborhood in downtown Kansas City, Missouri
 Crossroads, New Jersey
 Crossroads, New Mexico
 Cross Roads, Pennsylvania, a borough in York County
 Crossroads, Tennessee
 Crossroads, Wayne County, Tennessee
 Cross Roads, Texas
 Cross Roads, Henderson County, Texas
 Surry, Virginia, formerly Cross Roads
 Crossroads, Bellevue, Washington, a neighborhood
 Crossroads, Monongalia County, West Virginia
 Crossroads, Summers County, West Virginia
 Crossroads Village (Michigan), a county park near Flint, Michigan

Other uses
 Crossroads (folklore), a symbolic location often used in folklore
 Crossroads (mural), a public artwork in Indianapolis, Indiana, US
 Crossroads (mythology), a site of supernatural contact or events
 Crossroads (Umbanda), a syncretic Afro-Brazilian religion
 Crossroads Movement, which gave rise to the International Churches of Christ
 Operation Crossroads, the 1946 atomic bomb tests at Bikini Atoll
 Crossroads, a 1987 Commodore 64 game
 Crossroads, an intersection management system for self-driving cars
 The Crossroads (Portage, Michigan), a shopping mall in Portage, Michigan

See also
 Crossroads Church (disambiguation)
 Crossroads Mall (disambiguation)
 Crossroads School (disambiguation)
 Burial at cross-roads, a place where executed criminals and suicides were traditionally buried
 
 Carrefour (English: Crossroads), an international supermarket chain founded in France
 Fork in the road (disambiguation)